Monterey is an unincorporated community in Maxatawny Township in Berks County, Pennsylvania, United States. Monterey is located along U.S. Route 222, east of the intersection with Long Lane.

References

Unincorporated communities in Berks County, Pennsylvania
Unincorporated communities in Pennsylvania